"Moses Andrew Jackson Good Bye" is a song published in 1906. The music is composed by Ted Snyder, and the lyrics are written by Ren Shields . The song is about a domestic worker who is fed up with the mistreatment he receives from his master, and therefore decides to leave the household. The song was performed by artists like May Irwin and Arthur Collins.

Recordings
Edison Gold Moulded Record: 9442

Recording location- Philadelphia, Pennsylvania 

Recording date- 1906-11-14 

Recording repository- Source of original recording: Recorded Sound Section, Library of Congress

See also
List of pre-1920 jazz standards

References

External links
 Moses Andrew good bye at UCSB Cylinder Audio Archive

Songs about occupations
Songs about labor
Songs about parting
1906 songs
American popular music
Western music (North America)